The 1964 Ealing Council election took place on 7 May 1964 to elect members of Ealing London Borough Council in London, England. The whole council was up for election and the Labour party gained control of the council.

Background
These elections were the first to the newly formed borough. Previously elections had taken place in the Municipal Borough of Acton, Municipal Borough of Ealing and Municipal Borough of Southall. These boroughs were joined to form the new London Borough of Ealing by the London Government Act 1963.

A total of 177 candidates stood in the election for the 60 seats being contested across 20 wards. These included a full slate from the Conservative and Labour parties, while the Liberals stood 42 candidates. Other candidates included 8 from the Communist party, 6 from the British National party and 1 Independent. All wards were three-seat wards.

This election had aldermen as well as directly elected councillors.  Labour got all 10 aldermen.

The Council was elected in 1964 as a "shadow authority" but did not start operations until 1 April 1965.

Election result
The results saw Labour gain the new council with a majority of 8 after winning 34 of the 60 seats. Overall turnout in the election was 45.1%. This turnout included 1,350 postal votes.

Ward results

References

1964
1964 London Borough council elections